Simon David Cranstoun (born October 1971) is a British singer who spent many years as a busker on the streets of London and performed in the Dualers, a ska band he formed with his brother Tyber, before becoming better known as a composer and singer of music influenced by 1950s and 1960s rock and roll and rhythm and blues.

Life
Simon Cranstoun was born in Caterham, Surrey. His father, Bill Cranstoun, promoted Jamaican music in the 1960s. Si also loved 1950s and 1960s rock and roll and R&B music. Because he knew so many songs, he was chosen as singer for his high school band. He began to write songs at the age of 16. Cranstoun and his brother Tyber formed the Dualers, a ska band. Cranstoun spent twenty years as a street busker in London, and once was given 30p by Prime Minister Tony Blair.

Cranstoun met his wife, Tamu, while singing in Croydon. They have a daughter and a son. He left the Dualers in 2010. He adopted a style that had more rock or rhythm and blues. He formed a band which started to get hired to perform in pubs and small venues. He said of the difficulty in getting started, "they just saw me as a reggae artist doing bebop and were a bit like: 'What is he doing here? In 2013, he performed with Little Richard in Las Vegas. He was spotted in April that year and signed up with Warner Music's East West label. His single "Caught in the Moonlight" was shortlisted on the BBC Radio 2 playlist, while album Modern Life peaked at number 30 on the OCC UK Albums chart in October 2014.

Style
Cranstoun has said that Elvis Presley's music was the first music he ever listened to, and Presley profoundly influenced his taste. He told an interviewer, "As a kid I used to spend all my pocket money on vintage records from the '50s and '60s. I got it home, listened to it, loved it, sang along to it." His style draws heavily on music of this period. He said of his single "Never Gonna Let You Go", "Motown Soul fused with Rock 'n' Roll. Well, they said it could never be done so this song is going to prove them wrong." Chris Evans described his vintage pop as, "A squeeze of the Bee Gees, a bit of Billy Joel, a dash of Dean Friedman, and a ripple of Rodriguez."

Discography

Albums
2009: Get Lively, Galley Music	
2009: Skinny Jeans, Galley Music
2010: Alternative Floor Fillers, Galley Music		
2010: Get Festive Vol 1, Galley Music	
2012: Dancehalls and Supper Clubs, Galley Music	
2014: Modern Life, East West
2015: Old School, Ruf Records

Singles
2010: "Dynamo", Gallery Music	
2014: "Never Gonna Let You Go", East West		
2014: "Dance for Evermore", East West	
2014; "Caught in the Moonlight", East West

Notes

Sources

External links

1971 births
British rock and roll musicians
British rockabilly musicians
British ska musicians
British soul singers
English rhythm and blues singers
Living people
21st-century British singers
Musicians from Surrey